The purplish-backed quail-dove (Zentrygon lawrencii) is a species of bird in the family Columbidae. It is found in Costa Rica and Panama.

Taxonomy and systematics

The purplish-backed quail-dove is monotypic. However, the population of it in northwestern Costa Rica was at one time considered a subspecies. The purplish-backed quail-dove and the Tuxtla quail-dove (Zentrygon carrikeri) of Mexico were previously considered conspecific.

Description

Adults have a grayish white forehead and a bluish to greenish gray crown, nape, and hindneck. The mantle is dull purple and the rest of the upperparts and the wings are olive-brown to blackish brown with some reddish tinge. The central tail feathers are purple-brown and the outer ones blackish with gray tips. The face and throat are white with a black malar line and a line from the bill to the eye. The neck and breast are slate gray with greenish sides, the belly center pale buff to cinnamon, and the flanks chocolate. The eye is browish orange to red surrounded by bare magenta skin. The legs and feet are also magenta. The juvenile lacks the green and purple of the mantle, its facial pattern is less conspicuous, and most feathers have buff fringes.

Distribution and habitat

The purplish-backed quail-dove is resident from the Cordillera de Guanacaste in northern Costa Rica southeast to central Panama with scattered populations from there to Darién Province. It inhabits cool, wet, dense montane forest.

Behavior

Movement

The purplish-backed quail-dove usually walks or runs from danger rather than flying, though it sometimes will fly to an elevated perch.

Feeding

The purplish-backed quail-dove forages on the ground, usually singly or in pairs. It feeds on fruit, seeds, insects, and worms.

Breeding

The purplish-backed quail-dove's breeding season in Costa Rica spans from June to October but apparently starts earlier in Panama. It builds a bulky but loose nest as a shallow bowl of sticks lined with finer materials and places it in dense vegetation near the ground. It lays a single egg.

Vocalization

The purplish-backed quail-dove's song is a "three-syllable note pum-wha-huUUu, with a clear emphasis on the last syllable." The last syllable is all that is usually heard at a distance.

Status

The IUCN has assessed the purplish-backed quail-dove as being of Least Concern. Though it appears to be fairly common, it "could become threatened if forest habitat continues to be destroyed at present rates".

References

purplish-backed quail-dove
Birds of the Talamancan montane forests
purplish-backed quail-dove
purplish-backed quail-dove
Taxonomy articles created by Polbot